The Aqua Park "Macedonia" (Akva park "Makedonija") is a water park in Probištip, North Macedonia. It has an area of 18,000 m2. It has a many types of pools with many features.

References

External links 
 Aqua Park Macedonia - Probistip 

Water parks in North Macedonia
Probištip Municipality